Liacaridae is a family of mites in the order Oribatida. There are about 7 genera and more than 240 described species in Liacaridae.

Genera
These seven genera belong to the family Liacaridae:
 Adoristes Hull, 1916
 Birsteinius Krivolutsky, 1965
 Dorycranosus Woolley, 1969
 Opsioristes Woolley, 1967
 Planoristes Iturrondobeitia & Subías, 1978
 Xenillus Robineau-Desvoidy, 1839
 † Liacarus Michael, 1898

References

Further reading

External links

 

Acariformes
Acari families